DIN 62056  Electric DIN Standard for electric metering released 2002. Most of the description are used to certificate a common electronic readout from electrical readers, such as private households, industries and power generators over telephone lines or the Internet.

The DIN 62056 has some sub-parts, which describes several protocols.

 DIN  62056-3  Energy data identification code
 DIN  62056-21 Direct local data exchange.
 DIN  62058-42 Physical layer services and asynchronous data exchange
 DIN  62056-46 Data link Layer with HDLC Protocol
 DIN  62056-53 Data exchange for meter reading COSEM Application layer
 DIN  62056-61 OBIS Object identification Code or International Electrotechnical Commission 61107
 DIN  62056-62 Interface objects

62056